Opus Atlantica is the debut full-length album by the Swedish power metal band Opus Atlantica. It was released on November 21, 2002 by Regain Records.

Track listing
 "Line of Fire" – 3:58	
 "Judas Call" – 4:39	
 "Holy Graal" – 4:15	
 "Prince of Darkness" – 4:23	
 "Anthem" – 3:48	
 "Falling Angel" – 3:30	
 "Endless Slaughter" – 3:26	
 "Sleep with the Devil	" – 4:02	
 "Edge of the World" – 3:44	
 "Upside Down (bonus track)" – 4:11

Credits
Pete Sandberg – vocals
Johan Reinholdz – guitars 
Jonas Reingold – bass, keyboards 
Jaime Salazar – drums
 Robert Engstrand - keyboards

References

2002 albums